Events from the year 1987 in Sweden

Incumbents
 Monarch – Carl XVI Gustaf
 Prime Minister – Ingvar Carlsson

Events

23 January – The film Stockholmsnatt is released.
2 February – The 22nd Guldbagge Awards is presented.
2 April – Shopping mall A6 center is inaugurated near Jönköping.
27 July to 2 August – The tennis tournament 1987 Swedish Open.
16 November – In the Lerum train crash, nine people were killed and more than 100 were injured.
15 December – Covered bridge restaurant Gävlebro is inaugurated near Gävle.
25 December – The film Pelle the Conqueror is released.
31 December – TV 3 Sweden is launched.

Births

1 January – Patric Hörnqvist, ice hockey player
2 February – Christoffer Vikström, swimmer.
3 February – Christine Bjerendal, archer.
26 February – Johan Sjöstrand, handball player
10 March – Ebba Jungmark, high jumper.
14 April – Ida Odén, handball player
12 May – Björn Gund, ski mountaineer and cross-country skier
2 June – Darin Zanyar, singer-songwriter
7 July – Veronica Wagner, gymnast
27 July – Astrid Gabrielsson, sailor
8 August – Petter Menning, sprint canoer
2 October – Johanna Ahlm, handball player.
29 October – Tove Lo, singer-songwriter
17 November – Jacob Wester, freestyle skier
12 December – Sibel Redžep, Macedonian-born singer

Deaths

10 January – Håkan Malmrot, swimmer (born 1900).
20 October – Lars-Erik Sjöberg, ice-hockey player (born 1944)
7 November – Arne Borg, swimmer (born 1901).
12 November – Cornelis Vreeswijk, Dutch-Swedish singer-songwriter, actor, and poet (born 1937)
21 November – Axel Ståhle, horse rider (born 1891)

References

 
Sweden
Years of the 20th century in Sweden